Salem High School is a public high school in Salem, Ohio, United States.  It is the only high school in the Salem City School District. The school's athletic teams compete as the Salem Quakers in the Ohio High School Athletic Association as a member of the Eastern Buckeye Conference.

Since 2006, the building has also housed Salem Junior High School for grades 7 and 8, though it is administered separately from the high school.

Academics
According to the National Center for Education Statistics, in 2021-2022, the school reported an enrollment of 665 pupils in grades 9th through 12th. The school employed 33.00 teachers, yielding a student–teacher ratio of 20.12.

Salem High School offers courses in the traditional American curriculum.

Entering their third and fourth years, students can elect to attend the Columbiana County Career and Technical Center in Lisbon as either a part time student, taking core courses at SHS, while taking career or technical education at the career center, or as a full time student instead. Students may choose to take training in automotives, construction technology, cosmetology, culinary arts, health sciences, information technology, multimedia, landscape & environmental design, precision machining, veterinary science, and welding.

A student must earn 28 credits to graduate, including: 4 credits in a mathematics sequence, 3 credits in science, including life and physical science, 4 credits in English, 3 credits in a social studies sequence, 1 credit in fine art, 1 credit in health and physical education, 1 credit in personal finance, and 4.5 elective credits. Elective courses can be in English, science, social studies, foreign language, technology and business, family and consumer science, and fine art. Students attending the career center follow the same basic requirements, but have requirements in career & technical education rather than fine arts. All students must pass Ohio state exams in English I & II, Algebra I, Geometry, Biology, American History, and American Government, or the like.

Athletics
Salem High School's athletic teams are known as the Quakers. The mascots are Quaker Sam for boys' teams, and Quaker Lady for girls' teams.

College Football Hall of Fame inductee Earle Bruce had his first head coaching position at Salem.  He led the Quakers to a record of 28–9 over four seasons from 1956 to 1959.

OHSAA State Championships
 Boys' cross country - 1930, 1931, 1993, 2004, 2005
 Girls' cross country - 2005, 2006
 Boys'  track - 2005, 2006

Notable alumni

 Alan Freed - disc jockey who coined "rock and roll"
 Rich Karlis - NFL kicker
 Kirk Lowdermilk - NFL offensive lineman
 Jerry Meals - Major League Baseball umpire
 Chip Mosher - newspaper columnist, high school "Educator of Distinction," poet
 Tim Schuller (1949–2012) music critic
 Lou Slaby - NFL linebacker
 Lloyd Yoder - College Football Hall of Fame inductee

References

External links
 District website
 Salem High School Alumni Association

High schools in Columbiana County, Ohio
School buildings completed in 1959
Public high schools in Ohio
1860 establishments in Ohio
Educational institutions established in 1860